Sercan İpekçioğlu (born 1 July 1991), better known by his stage name Ezhel is a Turkish rapper and singer whose music blends trap, hip hop and reggae. His song "AYA" has been streamed more than 80 million times on Spotify. He has been given the title "Freestyle King" by Hip Hop Life.

Life and career 
Ezhel came from a musical family. His mother was an Anatolian folk dancer and his uncle was a musician and sound and light engineer. He received a scholarship to TED school, and began listening to American rappers like Eminem, 50 Cent and Tupac Shakur.

At 18, he began performing with a reggae band called Afra Tafra. After this group split, he formed his own reggae band, Kökler Filizleniyor, along with some of his friends from Ankara. He performed under the name Ais Ezhel until 2017.

Ezhel can also play the bağlama and guitar, and sings reggae with the band Kökler Filizleniyor. His debut album Müptezhel came out in 2017.

Ezhel was arrested on 24 May 2018 and sent to pretrial detention accused of "inciting drug use" in his songs. On 19 June, Ezhel was acquitted within 9 minutes of the opening of his first trial hearing. Ezhel's lawyer, Fuat Ekin, stated that, "We got an acquittal. We can say that justice has been done," according to the Media and Law Studies Association (MLSA).

In May 2019, The New York Times named Ezhel among the European pop acts that everyone should know.

Discography 
Studio albums
 Müptezhel (2017)
 Lights Out  (ft. Ufo361) (2019)
 Made in Turkey (ft. Murda)  (2020)

Singles

 Pelesenk (ft. Aga B) (2012)
 Antrenman (ft. Kamufle, Aga B & Harun Adil) (2012)
 Psikokramp (ft. Red) (2012)
 SBAG (ft. Aga B, Funk'd Up & Dj Suppa)
 3 Gün (2013)
 Façamızı Kes (2015)
 Ateşi Yak (ft. Aga B) (2016)
 Gerçek Sandım (ft. Sansar Salvo) (2016)
 Kayip Nesil (ft. Kamufle & Aga B) (2016)
 İmkansızım (2017)
 Kazıdık Tırnaklarla (2018)
 KAFA10 (ft. Anıl Piyancı) (2018)
 Felaket (2019)
 3500 (ft. Aga B) (2019)
 Summer of My Life (ft. Gringo, Yung Kafa ve Kücük Efendi) (2019)
 ne deve ne kush (ft. Büyük Ev Ablukada) (2019)
 Boynumdaki Chain (ft. Murda)  (2019)
 Olay (2019)
 Lolo (2019)
 Aya (ft. Murda) (2019)
 Pırlanta (ft. Murda) (2019)
 Mon Ami (ft. Eno) (2019)
 Bi Sonraki Hayatımda Gel (ft. Murda) (2020)
 Limit Yok (ft. Patron, Anıl Piyancı, Sansar Salvo, Allâme, Kamufle, Beta, Pit10) (2020)
 İz Bırak (ft. Vio) (2020)
 Jealous & Greedy (ft. OMG) (2020)
 Made in Turkey (ft. Murda) (2020)
 Devam (ft. Luciano & Gentleman) (2020)
 Allah'ından Bul (2020)
 LINK UP (ft. Kelvyn Colt) (2020)
 Melodien (ft. Newman) (2020)
 Not a day (ft. Patrice) (2021)
 Sakatat (2021)
 4 Kanaken (ft. Haftbefehl, Capo, Veysel) (2021)
 Lifeline (ft. Gentleman) (2021)
 Astronaut In The Ocean - Ezhel Remix  (ft. Masked Wolf) (2021)
 Bul Beni (2021)
 BENIM HAYALLER (ft. Luciano) (2021)
 End of Time (ft. Kelvyn Colt) (2021)
 Mayrig (2021)
 VIP (ft. Olexesh, Hell Yes)  (2021)
 Hayrola (2021)
 Ağlattın (2022)
 Daima (2022)
 Nerdesin (2022)
 Kuğulu Park (2023)
 Paspartu (2023)

Awards

References

External links 
 

Turkish rappers
Musicians from Ankara
Living people
1991 births
Turkish lyricists
21st-century Turkish male singers
21st-century Turkish singers
Golden Butterfly Award winners